Aloi is a village in North Kivu in eastern Democratic Republic of the Congo.

External links
Maplandia World Gazetteer

Populated places in North Kivu